Amy Theresa Austin is an Argentine ecologist. She is a principal research scientist at the National Scientific and Technical Research Council in Argentina and a professor at the Faculty of Agronomy, University of Buenos Aires.

In 1988, she received a Bachelor of Arts in environmental science at Willamette University and a Doctor of Philosophy in biological sciences at Stanford University in 1997.
In 2018, she is awarded the L'Oréal-UNESCO For Women in Science Awards “For her remarkable contributions to understanding terrestrial ecosystem ecology in natural and human-modified landscapes”.

References 

Argentine ecologists
Living people
Argentine women scientists
Women ecologists
L'Oréal-UNESCO Awards for Women in Science laureates
21st-century women scientists
Stanford University School of Humanities and Sciences alumni
Willamette University alumni
Year of birth missing (living people)